The MIAA men's basketball tournament is the annual conference basketball championship tournament for the NCAA Division III Michigan Intercollegiate Athletic Association. The tournament has been held annually since the NEAC's foundation in 1992. It is a single-elimination tournament and seeding is based on regular season records.

The tournament has been dominated by rivals Calvin and Hope. The Knights and Flying Dutchmen have won twenty-five of the thirty-one MIAA tournaments; in fact, fourteen of those finals have featured those two teams. 

The winner, declared conference champion, receives the MIAA's automatic bid to the NCAA Men's Division III Basketball Championship.

Results

Championship records

See also
Calvin–Hope men's basketball rivalry

References

NCAA Division III men's basketball conference tournaments
Tournament
Recurring sporting events established in 1992